Yarnaby is an Unincorporated community in Bryan County, Oklahoma, United States. It had a post office from January 22, 1883, until June 31, 1957.

Notes

References
  

Unincorporated communities in Bryan County, Oklahoma
Unincorporated communities in Oklahoma